La contadina astuta, or Livietta e Tracollo, is an opera buffa composed by Giovanni Battista Pergolesi to a libretto by Tommaso Mariani. It was originally composed as an intermezzo for Pergolesi's opera Adriano in Siria but subsequently became popular in its own right and was performed throughout Europe. It premiered along with Adriano in Siria on 25 October 1734 at the Teatro San Bartolomeo in Naples.

Roles

Recordings
Pergolesi Livietta e Tracollo & La Serva Padrona – Nancy Argenta (Livietta) and Werner Van Mechelen (Tracollo); La Petite Bande conducted by Sigiswald Kuijken. CD. Label: Accent ACC96123D
Pergolesi Adriano In Siria (including the intermezzo Livietta e Tracollo) – Monica Bacelli (Livietta) and Carlo Lepore (Tracollo); Accademia Bizantina conducted by Ottavio Dantone. DVD recorded live at the Teatro Pergolesi in Jesi in 2010, the tercentenary of Pergolesi's birth. Label: Opus Arte OA 1065

References

External links
Video extract from Livietta e Tracollo performed on 10 June 2010 at the Teatro Pergolesi (official YouTube channel of the Fondazione Pergolesi)

Operas
Opera buffa
Intermezzi
1734 operas
Italian-language operas
Operas set in Italy
Operas by Giovanni Battista Pergolesi